Renee Saulitis (born 12 August 2002) is an Australian rules footballer playing for  in the AFL Women's (AFLW).

Junior football
Saulitis was born in Warrnambool. Saulitis played for many clubs over her junior career, including the Ararat Storm in the Deakin University Female Football League, the Lake Wendouree Football Club in the Ballarat Football League, and her school's team, Ballarat Grammar, where she boarded. She was selected in the AFL Women's Academy in November 2019, after playing for the Greater Western Victoria Rebels in the NAB League Girls for the 2019 season, where she averaged 6.8 disposals and 0.4 goals. She only played 2 games for the Rebels in the 2020 season due to the impact of the COVID-19 pandemic, but in those two games she performed well, averaging 12 disposals and a goal a game. She also played for Vic Country in the 2019 AFL Women's Under 18 Championships.

AFLW career
On debut, Saulitis collected 7 disposals and 2 marks. After notching just 3 disposals the following round against , she was omitted from the side. She returned to the team in round 5, but was again omitted the following round.

Statistics
Statistics are correct to the end of the 2021 season.

|- style="background-color: #eaeaea"
! scope="row" style="text-align:center" | 2021
|style="text-align:center;"|
| 13 || 3 || 0 || 0 || 10 || 6 || 16 || 4 || 1 || 0.0 || 0.1 || 3.3 || 2.0 || 5.3 || 1.3 || 0.3 || 0
|- 
|- class="sortbottom"
! colspan=3| Career
! 3
! 0
! 0
! 10
! 6
! 16
! 4
! 1
! 0.0
! 0.0
! 3.3
! 2.0
! 5.3
! 1.3
! 0.3
! 0
|}

References

2002 births
Living people
St Kilda Football Club (AFLW) players
Greater Western Victoria Rebels players
Australian rules footballers from Victoria (Australia)